Hung Out is a British situation comedy which aired in 2010 as part of the Channel 4 Comedy Lab strand. The programme examined etiquette and friendship in a shared London house. It was created and written by a group of six friends who based the material on their real-life experiences.

Main cast
Emily Bevan as Anna
David L.E. Davis as Dave
Lucy McCall as Lucy
Alex McGettigan as Alex
James Shakeshaft as James
Catherine Shepherd as Maya

Main characters

Dave
Dave is intelligent and socially awkward. He is always arguing with flatmate James.

James
James is like a big baby – friendly, but unpredictable when provoked. He owes money to Dave.

Alex
Alex is attractive and cocky, but lacks a defined sense of self.

Lucy
Lucy considers herself independent but needs the validation of others.

Maya
Maya considers herself a free-spirited hippy but appears uptight to others.

Synopsis
Dave and James, who live on one side of the street, decide to make a spreadsheet detailing everything they owe each other. Meanwhile, Lucy and Alex, who live opposite, fall out over what to do on Saturday night – a dinner party or going ice skating are the two choices. A new girl called Maya moves into Lucy and Alex's flat. She is soon questioning what she has walked into - the light in the bathroom never works, and Lucy keeps managing to inconvenience her life by being an assertive control freak.

Reception
 Review from Den of Geek.

References

External links
 
 Comedy Lab page at Channel4.com

Channel 4 sitcoms
2010 British television series debuts
2010s British sitcoms
English-language television shows
Television shows set in London